The importation of enslaved Africans to what became New York began as part of the Dutch slave trade.  The Dutch West India Company imported eleven African slaves to New Amsterdam in 1626, with the first slave auction held in New Amsterdam in 1655.  With the second-highest proportion of any city in the colonies (after Charleston, South Carolina), more than 42% of New York City households held slaves by 1703, often as domestic servants and laborers.  Others worked as artisans or in shipping and various trades in the city.  Slaves were also used in farming on Long Island and in the Hudson Valley, as well as the Mohawk Valley region.

During the American Revolutionary War, the British troops occupied New York City in 1776. The Philipsburg Proclamation promised freedom to slaves who left rebel masters, and thousands moved to the city for refuge with the British. By 1780, 10,000 black people lived in New York. Many were slaves who had escaped from their owners in both northern and southern colonies. After the war, the British evacuated about 3,000 slaves from New York, taking most of them to resettle as free people in Nova Scotia, where they are known as Black Loyalists.

Of the Northern states, New York was next to last in abolishing slavery. (In New Jersey, mandatory, unpaid "apprenticeships" did not end until the Thirteenth Amendment ended slavery, in 1865.)

After the American Revolution, the New York Manumission Society was founded in 1785 to work for the abolition of slavery and to aid free blacks. The state passed a 1799 law for gradual abolition, a law which freed no living slave. After that date, children born to slave mothers were required to work for the mother's master as indentured servants until age 28 (men) and 25 (women). The last slaves were freed of this obligation on July 4, 1827 (28 years after 1799). African Americans celebrated with a parade.

Upstate New York, in contrast with New York City, was an anti-slavery leader. The first meeting of the New York State Anti-Slavery Society opened in Utica, although local hostility caused the meeting to be moved to the home of Gerrit Smith, in nearby Peterboro. The Oneida Institute, near Utica, briefly the center of American abolitionism, accepted both black and white male enrolees on an equal basis. New-York Central College, near Cortland, was an abolitionist institution of higher learning founded by Cyrus Pitt Grosvenor, that accepted all students without prejudice: male and female, white, Black, and native American, the first college in the United States to do so. It was also the first college to have black professors teaching white students. However, when a black male faculty member, William G. Allen, married a white student, they had to flee the country for England, never to return.

Dutch rule

Initial group of slaves
In 1613, Juan (Jan) Rodriguez from Santo Domingo became the first non-indigenous person to settle in what was then known as New Amsterdam. Of Portuguese and West African descent, he was a free man.

Systematic slavery began in 1626, when eleven captive Africans arrived on a Dutch West India Company ship in the New Amsterdam harbor. Historian Ira Berlin called them Atlantic Creoles who had European and African ancestry and spoke many languages. In some cases, they attained their European heritage in Africa when European traders conceived children with African women. Some were Africans who were crew members on ships and some came from ports of the Americas. Their first names—like Paul, Simon, and John—indicated if they had European heritage. Their last names indicated where they came from, like Portuguese, d'Congo, or d'Angola. People from the Congo or Angola were known for their mechanical skills and docile manners. Six slaves had names that indicated a connection with New Amsterdam, such as Manuel Gerritsen, which he likely received after their arrival in New Amsterdam and to differentiate from repeated first names. Men were laborers who worked the fields, built forts and roads, and performed other forms of labor. According to the principle of partus sequitur ventrem adopted from southern colonies, children born to enslaved women were considered born into slavery, regardless of the ethnicity or status of the father.In February 1644, the eleven slaves petitioned Willem Kieft, the director general for the colony, for their freedom. This was a time when there were skirmishes with Native American people and the Dutch wanted blacks to help protect their settlements and did not want the slaves to join the Native Americans. These eleven slaves were granted partial freedom, where they could buy land and a home and earn a wage from their master, and later full freedom. Their children remained in slavery. By 1664, the original eleven slaves, as well as other slaves who had attained half-freedom, for a total of at least 30 black landowners, lived on Manhattan near the Fresh Water Pond.

Slave trade
For more than two decades after the first shipment, the Dutch West India Company was dominant in the importation of slaves from the coasts of Africa. A number of slaves were imported directly from the company's stations in Angola to New Netherland.

Due to a lack of workers in the colony, it relied upon on African slaves, who were described by the Dutch as "proud and treacherous", a stereotype for African-born slaves. The Dutch West India Company allowed New Netherlanders to trade slaves from Angola for "seasoned" African slaves from the Dutch West Indies, particularly Curaçao, who sold for more than other slaves. They also bought slaves that came from privateers of Spanish slave ships. For instance, La Garce a French privateer, arrived in New Amsterdam in 1642 with Spanish Negroes that were captured from a Spanish ship. Although they claimed to be free, and not African, the Dutch sold them as slaves due to their skin color.

Unlike slaves from other colonies, slaves in New Amsterdam could sue another person whether white or black. Early instances included suits filed for lost wages and damages when a slave's pig was injured by a white man's dog. Slaves could also be sued.

Partial and full freedom
By 1644, some slaves had earned partial freedom, or half-freedom, in New Amsterdam and were able to earn wages. Under Roman-Dutch law they had other rights in the commercial economy, and intermarriage with working-class whites was frequent. Land grant records show that Land of the Blacks was located just north of New Amsterdam. As the English began to seize New Amsterdam in 1664, the Dutch freed about 40 men and women who had been granted half-slave status, to ensure that the English would not keep them enslaved. The new freemen had their original land grants finalized and all grants were officially marked as owned by the new freemen.

English rule

In 1664, the English took over New Amsterdam and the colony. They continued to import slaves to support the work needed. Enslaved Africans performed a wide variety of skilled and unskilled jobs, mostly in the burgeoning port city and surrounding agricultural areas. In 1703, more than 42% of New York City's households held slaves, a percentage higher than in the cities of Boston and Philadelphia, and second only to Charleston in the South.

In 1708, the New York Colonial Assembly passed a law entitled "Act for Preventing the Conspiracy of Slaves" which prescribed a death sentence for any slave who murdered or attempted to murder his or her master. This law, one of the first of its kind in Colonial America, was in part a reaction to the murder of William Hallet III and his family in Newtown (Queens).

In 1711, a formal slave market was established at the end of Wall Street on the East River, and it operated until 1762.

An act of the New York General Assembly, passed in 1730, the last of a series of New York slave codes, provided that:
Forasmuch as the number of slaves in the cities of New York and Albany, as also within the several counties, towns and manors within this colony, doth daily increase, and that they have oftentimes been guilty of confederating together in running away, and of other ill and dangerous practices, be it therefore unlawful for above three slaves to meet together at any time, nor at any other place, than when it shall happen they meet in some servile employment for their masters' or mistresses' profit, and by their masters' or mistresses' consent, upon penalty of being whipped upon the naked back, at the discretion of any one justice of the peace, not exceeding forty lashes for each offense.

Manors and towns could appoint a common whipper at no more than three shillings per person. Blacks were given the lowest status jobs, the ones the Dutch did not want to perform, like meting out corporal punishment and executions.

As in other slaveholding societies, the city was swept by periodic fears of slave revolt. Incidents were misinterpreted under such conditions. In what was called the New York Conspiracy of 1741, city officials believed a revolt had started. Over weeks, they arrested more than 150 slaves and 20 white men, trying and executing several, in the belief they had planned a revolt. Historian Jill Lepore believes whites unjustly accused and executed many blacks in this event.

In 1753, the Assembly provided there should be paid "for every negro, mulatto or other slave, of four years old and upwards, imported directly from Africa, five ounces of Sevil[le] Pillar or Mexico plate [silver], or forty shillings in bills of credit made current in this colony."

Slaves in the north were often owned by notable people like Benjamin Franklin, William Penn and John Hancock. William Henry Seward grew up in a slave-owning family in Upstate New York. Against slavery, he became Abraham Lincoln's Secretary of State during the Civil War.

American Revolution

African Americans fought on both sides in the American Revolution. Many slaves chose to fight for the British, as they were promised freedom by General Guy Carleton in exchange for their service. After the British occupied New York City in 1776, slaves escaped to their lines for freedom. The black population in New York grew to 10,000 by 1780, and the city became a center of free blacks in North America. The fugitives included Deborah Squash and her husband Harvey, slaves of George Washington, who escaped from his plantation in Virginia and reached freedom in New York.

In 1781, the state of New York offered slaveholders a financial incentive to assign their slaves to the military, with the promise of freedom at war's end for the slaves. In 1783, black men made up one-quarter of the rebel militia in White Plains, who were to march to Yorktown, Virginia for the last engagements.

By the Treaty of Paris (1783), the United States required that all American property, including slaves, be left in place, but General Guy Carleton followed through on his commitment to the freedmen. When the British evacuated from New York, they transported 3,000 Black Loyalists on ships to Nova Scotia (now Maritime Canada), as recorded in the Book of Negroes at the National Archives of Great Britain and the Black Loyalists Directory at the National Archives at Washington. With British support, in 1792 a large group of these Black Britons left Nova Scotia to create an independent colony in Sierra Leone.

Gradual abolition
In 1781, the state legislature voted to free those slaves who had fought for three years with the rebels or were regularly discharged during the Revolution. The New York Manumission Society was founded in 1785, and worked to prohibit the international slave trade and to achieve abolition. It established the African Free School in New York City, the first formal educational institution for blacks in North America. It served both free and slave children. The school expanded to seven locations and produced some of its students advanced to higher education and careers. These included James McCune Smith, who gained his medical degree with honors at the University of Glasgow after being denied admittance to two New York colleges. He returned to practice in New York and also published numerous articles in medical and other journals.

In 1785, Aaron Burr introduced a bill in the state legislature for immediate emancipation that was defeated 33–13; a second bill the same year was defeated 27–17.

By 1790, one in three blacks in New York state were free. Especially in areas of concentrated population, such as New York City, they organized as an independent community, with their own churches, benevolent and civic organizations, and businesses that catered to their interests.

Starting in the 1830s, and particularly between 1850 and 1860, following passage of the Fugitive Slave Act of 1850, professional bounty hunters, vigilance committees, and the underground railroad could be found in New York. Abolitionist leaders such as David Ruggles, black and white, helped fugitive slaves escape to Canada or safer locations. One famous abolitionist leader and writer who was helped by Ruggles was Frederick Douglass.  The cause was aided by white abolitionists such as William Lloyd Garrison and Sydney Howard Gay. Harriet Tubman made at least 2 trips to New York as a "captain" of the underground railroad.

Conversion to indentured servitude
Although there was movement towards abolition of slavery, the legislature took steps to characterize indentured servitude for blacks in a way that redefined slavery in the state. Slavery was important economically, both in New York City and in agricultural areas, such as Brooklyn. In 1799, the legislature passed the Act for the Gradual Abolition of Slavery. It freed no living slave. It declared children of slaves born after July 4, 1799, to be legally free, but the children had to serve an extended period of indentured servitude: to the age of 28 for males and to 25 for females. Slaves born before that date were redefined as indentured servants and could not be sold, but they had to continue their unpaid labor. 

From 1800 to 1827, white and black abolitionists worked to end slavery and attain full citizenship in New York.  During this time, there was a rise in white supremacy, which was at odds with the increased anti-slavery efforts of the early 19th century.  Peter Williams Jr., an influential black abolitionist and minister, encouraged other blacks to "by a strict obedience and respect to the laws of the land, form an invulnerable bulwark against the shafts of malice" to better the chances of freedom and a better life.

African Americans' participation as soldiers in defending the state during the War of 1812 added to public support for their full rights to freedom. In 1817, the state freed all slaves born before July 4, 1799 (the date of the gradual abolition law), to be effective in 1827. It continued with the indenture of children born to slave mothers until their 20s, as noted above. Because of the gradual abolition laws, there were children still bound in apprenticeships when their parents were free. This encouraged African-American anti-slavery activists.

In Sketches of America (1818), British author Henry Bradshaw Fearon, who visited the young United States on a fact-finding mission to inform Britons considering emigration, described the situation in New York City as he found it in August 1817: 

New York is called a "free state:" that it may be so so theoretically, or when compared with its southern neighbors; but if, in England, we saw in the Times newspaper such advertisements as the following [see image to right], we should conclude that freedom from slavery existed only in words.

Full freedom in 1827
On July 5, 1827, the African-American community celebrated final emancipation in the state with a parade through New York City. A distinctive Fifth of July celebration was chosen over July 4, because the national holiday was not seen as meant for blacks, as Frederick Douglass stated later in his famous What to the Slave Is the Fourth of July? speech of July 5, 1852.

Right to vote
New York residents were less willing to give blacks equal voting rights. By the constitution of 1777, voting was restricted to free men who could satisfy certain property requirements for value of real estate. This property requirement disfranchised poor men among both blacks and whites. The reformed Constitution of 1821 eliminated the property requirement for white men, but set a prohibitive requirement of $250, about the price of a modest house, for black men. In the 1826 election, only 16 blacks voted in New York City. In 1846, a referendum to repeal this property requirement was roundly defeated. "As late as 1869, a majority of the state's voters cast ballots in favor of retaining property qualifications that kept New York's polls closed to many blacks. African-American men did not obtain equal voting rights in New York until ratification of the Fifteenth Amendment to the United States Constitution, in 1870."

Freedom's Journal

Beginning March 16, 1827, John Brown Russwurm published Freedom's Journal, written by and directed to African Americans. Samuel Cornish and John Russwurm were editors of the journal; they used it to appeal to African Americans across the nation. The powerful words published spread rapid positive influence to African Americans who could help establish a new community. The emergence of an African-American journal was a very important movement in New York. It showed that blacks could gain education and be part of literate society.

White newspapers published a fictional "Bobalition" print series.  This was made in mockery of blacks, using the way an uneducated colored person would pronounce abolition.

New York City and Brooklyn

New York City Mayor Fernando Wood was strongly pro-slavery. He was a leader of the peace Democrats, and in the opposition to the 13th Amendment ending slavery. Just before the Civil War he had seriously proposed to the City Council that the city secede from the Union to form the Free City of Tri-Insula (insula means "island" in Latin), incorporating Manhattan, Staten Island, and Long Island except for pro-Union Brooklyn. The City Council approved the plan, but rescinded its approval 3 months later, after the Battle of Fort Sumter.

In contrast, Brooklyn was "a sanctuary city before its time", with one of the largest and most politically aware Black communities in the United States. Henry Ward Beecher, brother of Harriet Beecher Stowe, pastor at the Plymouth Church in Brooklyn Heights, was one of the country's most active abolitionists.

African Burial Ground
In 1991, a construction project required an archaeological and cultural study of 290 Broadway in Lower Manhattan to comply with the National Historic Preservation Act of 1966 before construction could begin. During the excavation and study, human remains were found in a former six-acre burial ground for African Americans that dated from the mid-1630s to 1795. It is believed that there are more than 15,000 skeletal remains of colonial New York's free and enslaved blacks. It is the country's largest and earliest burial ground for African-Americans.

This discovery demonstrated the large-scale importance of slavery and African Americans to New York and national history and economy. The African Burial Ground has been designated as a National Historic Landmark and a National Monument for its significance. A memorial and interpretive center for the African Burial Ground have been created to honor those buried and to explore the many contributions of African Americans and their descendants to New York and the nation.

See also
 African Americans in New York City
 African Burial Ground National Monument
 Human trafficking in New York

 New York Conspiracy of 1741
 Rose Butler
 Sylvester Manor

Notes

References

Further reading

(most recent first)

External links
 Slavery in New York, October 2005 – September 2007, an exhibition by the New-York Historical Society
 "Interview: James Oliver Horton: Exhibit Reveals History of Slavery in New York City", PBS Newshour, January 25, 2007
 Slavery In Mamaroneck Township, Larchmont Website

African-American history of New York (state)
Pre-statehood history of New York (state)
New York
African-American history in New York City
History of racism in New York (state)